Interstate 95 (I-95) is the main north–south Interstate Highway on the East Coast of the United States, running generally southwest–northeast through the US state of Rhode Island. It runs from the border with Connecticut near Westerly, through Warwick and Providence, and to the Massachusetts state line in Pawtucket. It has two auxiliary routes, both of which enter Massachusetts—I-195, a spur from Providence east to Cape Cod, and I-295, a western bypass of the Providence metropolitan area.

South of Warwick, I-95 does not follow US Route 1 (US 1), which it generally replaced in New England. It instead takes a shorter inland route, parallel to Route 3. Route 3 was designated New England Route 1A in 1922, a New England Interstate Route, but it has never been a US Route.

Route description

History

Southern Rhode Island

The diagonal corridor of Route 3 was a well-traveled shortcut to the older US 1 even before any part of I-95 was built. In the 1930s, a further cutoff was built in southeastern Connecticut and southwestern Rhode Island, joining Old Mystic, Connecticut, to Route 3 in Hopkinton. The existing Connecticut Route 84 in Connecticut was rerouted to use the new road (now Connecticut Route 184), and the short piece in Rhode Island was also numbered Rhode Island Route 84 (Route 84). (This alignment had been the Hopkinton and Richmond Turnpike—better known as the New London Turnpike—but had fallen into disrepair.) The right-of-way of New London Turnpike goes through the Big River Management Area (as a dirt road), crosses Division Road as a four-way intersection with the north side of the turnpike paved, has an interchange with I-95 (exit 7), and continues for  before connecting with Route 3 in West Warwick for a quarter mile. New London Turnpike turns into New London Ave and continues straight for  before connecting with Providence Street (Route 33). It follows Providence Street until it hits the Meshanticut Interchange.

The first section of what is now I-95 was planned as an upgrade and relocation of Route 84 and Route 3 from the state line north of Westerly to existing Route 3 of Richmond. The short Route 84 was widened to a four-lane divided road with one intersection at Gray Lane. Instead of merging with Route 3, it was modified to continue northeast, passing under Route 3 with a folded diamond interchange (modern day exit 1). The rest of the new road was designated Route 3 once it was completed on December 12, 1955. It was not built to freeway standards, only having interchanges at Route 3 in Hopkinton and Route 138 in Richmond (a cloverleaf; modern day exit 3), as well as a bridge over the Wood River and Mechanic Street.

A section of freeway (known as the Kent County Freeway) opened in July 1958, running from Route 3 at Kitts Corner northeast across the Big River (modern day exit 6) and east across Route 3 to Route 2 on the West Warwick–Warwick line (modern day exit 8). Its west end was a simple intersection with old Route 3, in which only northbound traffic could continue on the old road—southbound traffic had to enter the new freeway east of the Big River. The only two interchanges were with Route 3 east of the Big River (a diamond interchange) and with Route 2 at its east end (a four-ramp interchange providing half the ramps of a cloverleaf).

The I-95 designation was approved on June 27, 1958. The section in southern Rhode Island was temporarily designated Rhode Island Route 95 (Route 95) until it could be upgraded to a freeway. This route ran from the Connecticut state line along what had been Route 84, continuing along the relocated Route 3 to north of Richmond, along normal Route 3 to Kitts Corner, and along the new freeway east to Route 2. As much as possible, Route 3 was moved back to the old road; it only used the new freeway by necessity in the area near Kitts Corner and over the Big River. Connecticut also renumbered their section of Connecticut Route 84 to Connecticut Route 95 at that time.

I-95 in Connecticut was finished December 12, 1964, to the Rhode Island state line, where it connected to the older Route 95 divided highway. The old road from the border to Gray Lane was combined with the frontage road built when Route 84 was upgraded to form what is now known as Extension 184. The portion from the Connecticut state line to Route 3 north of Richmond was upgraded to a freeway with construction ending May 1968. To the north, that freeway was connected with the Kent County Freeway by a new section, opened November 22, 1969, as the last section of I-95 in Rhode Island. The connection to Route 3 at Kitts Corner was removed, and Route 3 was moved back to the old road over the Big River. Route 95 was renumbered I-95, as the whole road was now a freeway.

An interchange with the New London Turnpike named exit 21 (old exit 7) was added to the Kent County Freeway by 1972. In 1983, a new interchange with Hopkins Hill Road named exit 19 (old exit 6A) opened.

Providence area
The construction of I-95 split the city of Providence in two, cutting off the city's western neighborhoods from downtown and its eastern neighborhoods. 

Among the areas affected was Cathedral Square, which had been a bustling center of civic life before World War II. I-95, constructed adjacent to Cathedral Square, changed the area's character forever. A 1972 redesign by I. M. Pei attempted to revitalize the square but failed.

Pawtucket area

The people of Pawtucket feared the construction of I-95 as early as 1949. Editions of The Times and The Providence Journal in 1949 recall how neighbors in the Woodlawn section of Pawtucket feared the construction of the highway. According to Rhode Island Department of Transportation (RIDOT) blueprints, the highway was originally planned for the west side of Pawtucket, avoiding the Blackstone River. The highway was originally designed to be constructed east of the New York and New Haven Railroad tracks and create underpasses on Mineral Spring Avenue, Broad Street, and Dexter Street. The highway was meant to travel east of Pawtucket/Central Falls station and into South Attleboro, Massachusetts.

The Pawtucket River Bridge is part of I-95 and has been replaced.

Exit list
RIDOT converted exit number from sequential to mileage-based numbering per federal highway standards. Exit renumbering began on August 28, 2022, and completed on November 3, 2022.

Tolls
High-speed toll gantries were installed at several locations along I-95 between 2018 and 2020. Toll rates at each point varied between $2.25 and $9.50. Tolls were collected only from commercial trucks pulling trailers. Federal judges ordered Rhode Island officials on September 21, 2022, to stop collecting truck-only tolls due to the long-hauling trucking industry's complaint that the highway charges were unconstitutional and unfair.

References

External links

 
 

95
Providence metropolitan area
 Rhode Island
Transportation in Washington County, Rhode Island
Transportation in Kent County, Rhode Island
Transportation in Providence County, Rhode Island
Tolled sections of Interstate Highways